Taasir is an Urdu-language daily newspaper published in India. It was established in 2013. It launched in Patna, the capital city of Bihar. Taasir is  being published from eleven Indian states with 12 editions, and is the country's highest circulating Urdu-written daily newspaper.

Overview
Taasir Delhi, Ranchi, and Patna are RNI-certified circulations that cover Delhi, Jharkhand, and Bihar States respectively.

The Bureau of Outreach and Communication, formerly known as DAVP, empaneled Patna, Muzaffarpur, Ranchi, Delhi, and West Bengal editions for issuing regular Central Government announcements.

Online editions are available in Urdu, Hindi, and English. The paper has regular online readership in the USA, the UK, Europe, Canada, UAE, Singapore, China, South Africa, Qatar, Pakistan, and Israel. 

Taasir group has added editions for Bhopal, Mumbai, and Kolkata. 

The newspaper covers topics including political, social, economic, sport, cultural, women and children. 

The owner of the Taasir group of newspapers established a huge newspaper printing plant at the capital city of Patna in the State of Bihar and left most of its competitors far behind using modern printing technology. 

Title source link  

http://rni.nic.in/verified_titles/verified_titles.aspx

History

Taasir was first launched in Patna. The first issue was published on 5 January 2013 and was distributed only in the city area. The distribution grew and reached eight Indian states, editing up to nine editions: Patna, Muzaffarpur, New Delhi, Bengaluru, Gangtok, Ranchi, Guwahati, Howrah, Chennai and Bhagalpur. 

Some editions of Taasir cover more than five states. For example, the Patna edition covers Uttar Pradesh, West Bengal, Delhi, Uttrakhand, and Jharkhand as well as Bihar.

Taasir Patna is empaneled by the Information and Public Relations Department, Government of Jharkhand, and Government of Uttar Pradesh. This edition of Taasir has already been empaneled by the Government of Bihar for receiving regular government announcements. Bharat Sanchar Nigam Limited (BSNL) is empaneled to receive regular announcements.

Taasir is empaneled by the I&PRDs of different other state governments, such as Chhattisgarh, Madhya Pradesh, Haryana, Telangana, Andhra Pradesh, Uttar Pradesh, Jammu & Kashmir, and Jharkhand.

Taasir launched its mobile application in the name of Roznama Taasir. According to a Google Analytics report, the e-Taasir is read by the readers in other countries, including the USA, UK, Canada, Saudi Arabia, UAE, Pakistan, Germany, Australia, Bangladesh, Burundi, Colombia, Denmark, Iran, Japan, Malaysia, Mexico, Nepal, and Oman.

References

2013 establishments in Bihar
Mass media in Bihar
Newspapers established in 2013
Newspapers published in Patna
Newspapers published in Muzaffarpur
Urdu-language newspapers published in India